Archibald "Archie" Easton Baxter (December 16, 1844 – October 6, 1925) was a Scottish-American lawyer and politician from New York.

Life 
Baxter was born on December 16, 1844 in Port Glasgow, Scotland. In 1850, his father Duncan brought the family to America, where they settled in Corning, New York. Baxter worked on a farm and studied at the Corning Academy. He was a clerk in the village post-office when the American Civil War broke out.

Baxter enrolled in the 141st New York Volunteer Infantry in August 1862 and was mustered in as a private in Company E. By September 1862, he was promoted to sergeant, followed by first sergeant in April 1863 and first lieutenant in August 1863. In May 1864, he was wounded during the Battle of Resaca. On January 1, 1865, he was promoted to captain. He was mustered out with his company near Washington D.C. in June 1865. He left the service as brevet-major of volunteers. He later served as adjutant and lieutenant-colonel in the National Guard of New York.

Baxter returned to Corning after the War. From 1865 to 1872, he worked in the Tioga Railroad Company. In 1874, he was elected clerk of Steuben County. When he moved to Bath to work as clerk, and began studying law under Judge William Rumsey. He then attended Albany Law School, graduating in 1879. After graduating, he moved to Elmira and started practicing law there. He was an active member of and public speaker for the Republican Party.

In 1882, Baxter ran for the New York's 29th congressional district, losing the election to John Arnot Jr. In 1889, President Benjamin Harrison appointed him United States Marshal for the Northern District of New York. He was a delegate to the 1896 Republican National Convention.

In 1895, Baxter was elected Clerk of the New York State Assembly. He served as Clerk in 1895, 1896, 1897, 1898, 1899, 1900, 1901, 1902, 1903, 1904, 1905, 1906, and 1907.

Baxter was a 32nd degree freemason, a member of the Benevolent and Protective Order of Elks, and a member of the Grand Army of the Republic. He attended the Episcopal Church. He married Rosemund E. Wheeler in 1873. Their children were Charles, Louise, and Maud.

Baxter moved to New York City in 1913. He died there on October 6, 1925. He was buried in Sylvan Lawn Cemetery in Greene, New York.

References

External links 

 The Political Graveyard
 Archie E. Baxter at Find a Grave

1844 births
1925 deaths
19th-century American politicians
Clerks of the New York State Assembly
Burials in New York (state)
Scottish emigrants to the United States
People from Port Glasgow
Politicians from Corning, New York
People of New York (state) in the American Civil War
Union Army officers
New York National Guard personnel
People from Bath, New York
Albany Law School alumni
New York (state) lawyers
Politicians from Elmira, New York
New York (state) Republicans
United States Marshals
American Freemasons
19th-century American Episcopalians
20th-century American Episcopalians
19th-century American lawyers